The Loneman Fire Lookout in Glacier National Park is significant as one of a chain of staffed fire lookout posts within the park. The low two-story timber-construction structure with a pyramidal roof was built in 1933. The lookout uses a standard design originated by the U.S. Forest Service. Built in 1930, it is one several similar structures built in a program to establish an overlapping chain of fire lookouts in the park.

References

Government buildings completed in 1930
Towers completed in 1930
Fire lookout towers on the National Register of Historic Places in Montana
Rustic architecture in Montana
National Register of Historic Places in Flathead County, Montana
1930 establishments in Montana
National Register of Historic Places in Glacier National Park